Hedaya may refer to:

 Hidayah (disambiguation), Arabic word meaning "guidance"

People
Dan Hedaya, American character actor
Hedaya Malak, Egyptian taekwondo practitioner
Ovadia Hedaya, leading Israeli rabbi